Cotton Coulson (1952 – May 27, 2015 in Tromsø, Norway) was a photographer known for his work for National Geographic magazine.

Professional life
Coulson graduated from New York University Film School in 1975, and was hired by National Geographic in 1976, after having begun contributing to them as a freelancer in 1975.

He also worked at The Baltimore Sun, where he was a director of photography, and at U.S. News & World Report, where he was an associate director of photography.

In 1996, he collaborated with Rick Smolan on Smolan's "24 Hours in Cyberspace" project; he subsequently joined CNET, where he was senior vice-president of creative services until 1999, at which point he was promoted to vice president and executive producer.

Death
On May 24, 2015, Coulson was scuba diving in the waters of the Svalbard Archipelago as part of a photography assignment, when he signaled to his diving partner that he needed to surface immediately.
By the time they emerged from the water, he was unresponsive; CPR was performed, but he died in hospital three days later, without having ever regained consciousness.

Personal life
Coulson was married to fellow photographer Sisse Brimberg, who was also his professional partner; they met at a photography seminar in 1976.

He was named for Cotton Mather.

References

External links
Keenpress, official site of Coulson and Brimberg

American photographers
1952 births
2015 deaths
Tisch School of the Arts alumni
National Geographic photographers
Accidental deaths in Norway
Underwater diving deaths